Shillingford St. George is a village on the outskirts of Exeter, East Devon, England. It is about 3 miles south of the City of Exeter.

External links

 

Villages in Devon